Istolatios or Istolatius was a warlord and military chief of the Turdetans, whose activity took place during the 3rd century BC. Endowed with great prestige, he organized a large army with Turdetans and Celtiberian and Iberian troops to oppose the Carthaginian invasion of Hamilcar Barca.

Biography 
Diodorus Siculus describes Istolatios as a Celtic strategist in the service of the Turdetani, and describes him accompanied by a brother who acted as lieutenant. This brother has been popularly identified as Indortes, successor to Istolatius, but Diodorus's text does not seem to treat them as the same.

When Hamilcar and his mercenary contingent invaded the Guadalquivir valley in 220 BC, Istolatios went to meet him with an army collected from the Turdetan and Iberian peoples of the region. However, being unprepared for the variety and strategy of the Carthaginian forces, which included war elephants, they were defeated. Istolatios himself was tortured and crucified.

References 

3rd-century BC rulers in Europe
220 BC deaths

Year of birth unknown

Celtic history
Iron Age Europe